The enzyme homoaconitate hydratase catalyzes the chemical reaction

(1R,2S)-1-hydroxybutane-1,2,4-tricarboxylate  (Z)-but-1-ene-1,2,4-tricarboxylate + H2O

This enzyme belongs to the family of lyases, specifically the hydro-lyases, which cleave carbon-oxygen bonds.  The systematic name of this enzyme class is (1R,2S)-1-hydroxybutane-1,2,4-tricarboxylate hydro-lyase [(Z)-but-1-ene-1,2,4-tricarboxylate-forming]. Other names in common use include homoaconitase, cis-homoaconitase, HACN, Lys4, LysF, and 2-hydroxybutane-1,2,4-tricarboxylate hydro-lyase (incorrect).  This enzyme participates in lysine biosynthesis.

References

 
 
 

EC 4.2.1
Enzymes of unknown structure